Gishu Mindaye (born August 18, 1986) is an Ethiopian long distance track, and road running athlete.

Gishu won the 2006 Rotterdam Marathon on April 9 beating Helena Javornik and Isabel Elizmendi after 2:28:30, breaking away from Javornik passing the 35 km mark. In September that year she returned to Rotterdam taking part in the 1/2 Marathon. Gishu finished second behind Mara Yamauchi finishing almost two minutes earlier.

Achievements
All results regarding marathon, unless stated otherwise

External links
 marathoninfo
 
 IAAF report on Rotterdam Marathon win

1986 births
Living people
Ethiopian female long-distance runners
Ethiopian female marathon runners
Place of birth missing (living people)
20th-century Ethiopian women
21st-century Ethiopian women